Czesław Bartolik (born 16 April 1918 - 29 March 2008) was a Polish football player and manager.

Senior career
Bartolik started his career with the youth team of KS Gdynia before starting his professional career with Arka Gdynia in 1937-38, and Gedania Danzig from 1938-39. In 1939 Gedania Danzig was banned from partaking in sports events by the Nazi Party during the Occupation of Poland. Due to the outbreak of World War II Bartolik was moved to Krakow, where he played for Wisla Krakow, Garbarnia Kraków, and Groble Kraków from 1940-44 playing in the underground Kraków Occupation Championships. After the war ended he moved back to Danzig, now named Gdańsk, to play for Gedania Gdańsk (the same team re-created after its banning in 1939). After three years Bartolik moved to Bałtyk Gdynia where he became a player manager.

Managerial career

Bałtyk Gdynia was the start of his time in management. In 1950 he moved to Lechia Gdańsk as manager, where in 1951 he also played in the league for a final time. In 1951 he guided Lechia to the Ekstraklasa, getting promoted from the II liga. After Lechia he had spells with Odra Opole, Arka Gdynia, Stoczniowiec Gdańsk and Flota Gdynia. In 1964 he managed a team for the Polish Ocean Lines ship MS Batory where he won the Atlantic League in 1966.

Death

Bartolik died on 29 March 2006 aged 89. He was buried in the Orłowo district of Gdynia.

References

1918 births
2008 deaths
Arka Gdynia players
Gedania Danzig players
Lechia Gdańsk players
Wisła Kraków players
Gedania 1922 Gdańsk players
Lechia Gdańsk managers
Polish footballers
Polish football managers
Arka Gdynia managers
Odra Opole managers
Footballers from Saint Petersburg
Association football forwards